The Ping River, along with the Nan River, is one of the two main tributaries of the Chao Phraya River. It originates at Doi Thuai in the Daen Lao Range, in Chiang Dao district, Chiang Mai province. After passing Chiang Mai, it flows through the provinces of Lamphun, Tak, and Kamphaeng Phet. At the confluence with the Nan River at Nakhon Sawan (also named Paknam Pho in Thai), it forms the Chao Phraya River.

Tributaries

Khlung River (2)
Suan Mak River (Joins the Ping at )
Wang Chao River (Joins the Ping at )
Pra Dang River (Joins the Ping at )
Raka River (Placement in tributary tree is approximate, geographical coordinates unavailable due to poor satellite resolution)
Tributaries include Mo, Tui, Chang & Soi Rivers
Tak River (Joins the Ping at )
Ko River (Joins the Ping at )
Tun River (Placement in tributary tree is approximate, geographical coordinates unavailable due to poor satellite resolution)
Pa River
Chaem River (Joins the Ping at )
Klang River (Joins the Ping at )
Li River (Joins the Ping at )
Tun River (2) (Placement in tributary tree is approximate, geographical coordinates unavailable due to poor satellite resolution)
Khan River (2) (Joins the Ping at )
Wang River (2) (Joins the Khan at )
Kuang River (Joins the Ping at )
Tha River (Joins Kuang at )
Sapuat River (Placement in tributary tree is approximate, geographical coordinates unavailable due to inaccurate station data from Royal Irrigation Department)
Khanat River (Placement in tributary tree is approximate, geographical coordinates unavailable due to poor satellite resolution)
San River (Placement in tributary tree is approximate, geographical coordinates presently undeterminable due to recently built dam)
Tip River (Placement in tributary tree is approximate, geographical coordinates presently undeterminable due to recently built dam)
Phaem River (Placement in tributary tree is approximate, geographical coordinates unavailable due to poor satellite resolution)
Mempin River (Placement in tributary tree is approximate, geographical coordinates unavailable due to poor satellite resolution)
Lai River (2) (Placement in tributary tree is approximate, geographical coordinates unavailable due to poor satellite resolution)
Sa River (Joins the Ping at )
Rim River (Joins the Ping at )
Nai River (Placement in tributary tree is approximate, geographical coordinates unavailable due to poor satellite resolution)
Taeng River (Joins the Ping at )
Ngat River (Joins the Ping at )

Ping Basin
The Ping Basin is one of the largest drainage basins of the Chao Phraya Watershed, draining  of land.

The main dams in the basin are the Bhumibol Dam and the Doi Tao Dam.

National Parks
The Ping itself originates in Huai Nam Dang National Park and flows through Mae Ping National Park.

Gallery

References

Rivers of Thailand
Geography of Chiang Mai province
Geography of Lamphun province
Geography of Tak province
Geography of Kamphaeng Phet province
Chao Phraya River